Antonio Scull Hernández (born September 10, 1965 in Havana) is a first baseman with Industriales of the Cuban National Series and a longtime member of the Cuban national baseball team. Representing Cuba, Scull won gold medals at the 1996 and 2004 Summer Olympics and won a silver medal in 2000.

During the 2005-06 Cuban National Series, at age 40, Scull hit .299 for Industriales, playing in 67 of the team's 90 games.

References

External links
 

1965 births
Living people
Olympic baseball players of Cuba
Baseball players at the 1996 Summer Olympics
Baseball players at the 2000 Summer Olympics
Baseball players at the 2004 Summer Olympics
Olympic gold medalists for Cuba
Olympic silver medalists for Cuba
Olympic medalists in baseball
Medalists at the 2004 Summer Olympics

Medalists at the 2000 Summer Olympics
Medalists at the 1996 Summer Olympics